Charles Berling (born 30 April 1958) is a French actor, director and screenwriter.

Life and career
Charles Berling, son of a navy doctor, is also the nephew of the literary critic Raymond Picard. His mother, Nadia, "only daughter of (French) settlers in Morocco" was born in Meknes (Morocco); she died in 2004.

When he was two years old he left Paris for Brest, then Toulon, then, at seven, Tahiti.

He studied acting at the Belgian school INSAS, in Brussels. He is the father of the actor Émile Berling.

Filmography

Theater

Narrator 
 March of the Penguins

Notes and sources

External links 

 

1958 births
Living people
People from Saint-Mandé
French male film actors
French male television actors
French male stage actors
Commandeurs of the Ordre des Arts et des Lettres
Best Actor Lumières Award winners
French film directors
French male screenwriters
French screenwriters
20th-century French male actors
21st-century French male actors